Martelella endophytica is a Gram-negative, aerobic, non-spore-forming, non-motile bacteria from the genus of Martelella which was isolated from the plant Rosa rugosa on the Namhae Island in Korea.

References

External links
Type strain of Martelella endophytica at BacDive -  the Bacterial Diversity Metadatabase

Hyphomicrobiales
Bacteria described in 2013